Matthew Jimmy David Garbett (born 13 April 2002) is a New Zealand professional footballer who plays as a midfielder for Dutch club NAC Breda on loan from the Italian club Torino, and the New Zealand national team.

Club career

Western Suburbs
Aged 12, Garbett moved from his hometown of Paraparaumu to Porirua to attend the Olé Football Academy. During this time, Garbett played for Olé-affiliated club Western Suburbs in the Central Premier League, making his debut in 2017 and reaching the final of the 2018 Chatham Cup.

Team Wellington
As part of the Olé Football Academy's affiliation with ISPS Handa Premiership club Eastern Suburbs, Garbett linked up with the side to participate in the 2018 National Youth League. He made one appearance for the senior team, coming on as a substitute in a 5–0 win over Hawke's Bay United on 20 October 2018. The following season, Olé formed a new affiliation with Team Wellington; Garbett followed suit, signing for them in 2019. He made his only appearance for the club in a 2–1 win over Canterbury United on 1 December 2019.

Falkenbergs FF
Following his standout performances for New Zealand in the 2019 FIFA U-17 World Cup, Garbett signed for Allsvenskan side Falkenbergs FF on 24 January 2020. Garbett made his professional debut for the club in a 1–0 Svenska Cupen victory against Halmstads BK.

Torino
After participating at the Summer Olympics with the OlyWhites, Garbett signed a three-year deal with Torino, initially joining the Primavera team.

Garbett was called up to the senior team for the first time on 10 April 2022, remaining on the bench for a Serie A clash against AC Milan. After ten straight appearances on the bench to begin the 2022–23 Serie A season, Garbett finally made his professional debut for Torino in a Coppa Italia clash against Cittadella on 18 October 2022, coming on as a substitute for Nikola Vlašić in a 4–0 win.

Loan to NAC Breda
On 31 January 2023, Garbett joined NAC Breda in the Netherlands on loan with an option to buy.

International career

U-17
Garbett was part of the New Zealand team that won the 2018 OFC U-16 Championship, making his debut in a 5–0 loss against the Solomon Islands on 12 September 2018. New Zealand won the tournament, qualifying for the 2019 FIFA U-17 World Cup held in Brazil. Garbett played all three games in the group stage, scoring against Angola and Canada as New Zealand finished third in their group.

U-23
Originally named as a travelling reserve for the OlyWhites to play at the 2020 Summer Olympics, Garbett ended up starting in the final two games – first in a 0–0 draw in the final pool game against Romania, followed by a loss to Japan in the quarter-finals.

Senior national team
Garbett made his international debut with the senior New Zealand national team in a 2–1 friendly win over Curaçao on 9 October 2021.

Career statistics
Scores and results list New Zealand's goal tally first, score column indicates score after each Garbett goal.

Honours
Western Suburbs
Central League: 2017, 2019
2018 Chatham Cup runner-up: 2018

Eastern Suburbs
New Zealand Football Championship: 2018-19

New Zealand U17
OFC U-17 Championship: 2018

References

External links

Living people
2002 births
New Zealand association footballers
New Zealand international footballers
New Zealand youth international footballers
English footballers
English emigrants to New Zealand
Team Wellington players
Falkenbergs FF players
Torino F.C. players
NAC Breda players
New Zealand Football Championship players
Allsvenskan players
Superettan players
Association football forwards
New Zealand expatriate association footballers
Expatriate footballers in Sweden
New Zealand expatriate sportspeople in Sweden
Expatriate footballers in Italy
New Zealand expatriate sportspeople in Italy
Expatriate footballers in the Netherlands
New Zealand expatriate sportspeople in the Netherlands
Footballers at the 2020 Summer Olympics
Olympic association footballers of New Zealand